The Junior Eurovision Song Contest 2015 was the thirteenth edition of the annual Junior Eurovision Song Contest, and took place, for the first time, in Bulgaria. The Bulgarian national broadcaster BNT was the host broadcaster for the event. The final took place on 21 November 2015 and was held at the Arena Armeec in Sofia. Poli Genova, a Bulgarian singer and former representative of Bulgaria in the Eurovision Song Contest 2011 (and later the Eurovision Song Contest 2016), hosted the show.

The winner of the contest was Destiny Chukunyere, who represented Malta with the song "Not My Soul".  and  finished in second and third place, respectively. This contest marked the second time a country won twice in a three-year period (following Belarus winning twice in a period of three years between 2005 and 2007).

Location

Bidding phase
Following 's win at the Junior Eurovision Song Contest 2014, the European Broadcasting Union had given the Italian broadcaster RAI the first refusal to host the 2015 contest. However, on 15 January 2015, RAI declined the right to host the contest. The Executive Supervisor for the Junior Eurovision Song Contest, Vladislav Yakovlev, praised the Italian broadcaster RAI for their time looking into the possibilities of hosting, even though they made their debut appearance in 2014, and further explained how the EBU were in a lucky position to have received bids from two countries.

The EBU announced later that day that they had received bids from two countries to host the contest; those countries being  and last year host , who finished in second and fourth places respectively in 2014. Bulgarian broadcaster BNT confirmed on 15 January they had submitted a bid to host the 2015 contest. The national broadcaster for Malta, Public Broadcasting Services (PBS), stated prior to the 2014 contest that they would host again if they won.

On 26 January 2015, it was announced that Bulgaria had been chosen to host the 2015 edition, which took place on 21 November 2015. It was the first time that the nation organised any Eurovision event. In March 2015, it was confirmed that Sofia would be the host city, with the Arena Armeec being the host venue.

Format

Graphic design

On 22 May 2015, a press conference devoted to the Junior Eurovision Song Contest was held in Vienna during the organisation of the Eurovision Song Contest 2015. At the press conference, the slogan for the 2015 Junior contest was revealed to be #Discover. The slogan was selected to signify how the Junior Eurovision Song Contest endeavours to find new melodies, explore new people and create links between individuals.

On 23 June 2015, the EBU in conjunction with the host broadcaster BNT, presented the official logo for the 2015 edition, during the Steering Group meeting held in Sofia. Viara Ankova, the Director General of the host broadcaster explained that the logo's concept was inspired behind the idea of a seeded head of a dandelion being blown, "something that everyone has done as a child".

Postcards
The postcards used to introduce each competing nation during the show were built around the concept of selfies. The postcards featured the competing artists sending their selfie to a group of three teenagers in Bulgaria, which would then inspire their adventures. Different sights and cities were showcased with the teenagers documenting their journey through their own selfies and sending them to the competing artist.

Host

Bulgarian singer Poli Genova was announced as the host of the competition on 21 October 2015. Genova had previously represented Bulgaria at the Eurovision Song Contest in 2011. In addition, the running order draw and opening ceremonies were hosted by Bulgarian singer Joanna Dragneva, who had also previously represented Bulgaria at the Eurovision Song Contest in 2008 as part of Deep Zone Project.

Opening and interval acts
At the start of the show Krisia Todorova, Bulgaria's 2014 representative alongside Hasan & Ibrahim, performed a short reworked sequence of the theme song "#Discover". The participants were introduced in the flag parade to the theme music with dancers on stage and were joined at the end by host Genova who sang the last line of the theme song. The interval saw the competing artists perform the theme song together, Genova performed during the interlude whilst Bulgaria's representatives in 2014 performed their second placed entry "Planet of the Children" as well as new single "Not The Only One". Vincenzo Cantiello closed the interval and performed his winning song from 2014, "Tu primo grande amore".

Participating countries
On 7 October 2015, it was confirmed that seventeen countries would take part in the contest.  and  made their debut,  returned after a two-year absence and  returned after a one-year absence.  and  withdrew after returning in the 2014 edition, while  withdrew for the first time since 2008. It was the first time since 2007, that 17 countries would take part.

Participants and results

Detailed voting results 

Destiny Chukunyere who represented Malta with the song "Not My Soul", was declared the winner after all the votes had been cast from all of the seventeen participating countries and the kids' jury. Below is a full breakdown of how the votes were cast.

12 points 
Below is a summary of all 12 points received. All countries were given 12 points at the start of voting to ensure that no country finished with nul points.

Spokespersons 

The order in which each country announced their votes was the same as the running order of the performances. Details of the running order were published by the EBU on 15 November 2015. The spokespersons are shown below alongside each participating country.

 Krisia Todorova
 Dunja Jeličić
 Lizi Pop
 Nikola Petek
 Vincenzo Cantiello
 Julia van Bergen
 Ellie Blackwell
 Anna Banks
 Sofia Dolganova
 Aleksandrija Čaliovski
 Valeria Drobyshevskaya
 Betty
 Sofia Kutsenko
 Vladimir Petkov
 Arianna Ulivi
 Federica Falzon
 Majda Bejzade
 Lejla Vulić

Other countries

For a country to be eligible for potential participation in the Junior Eurovision Song Contest, it needs to be an active member of the European Broadcasting Union (EBU).  It is unknown whether the EBU issue invitations of participation to all 56 active members like they do for the Eurovision Song Contest. The EBU Active Members listed below have made the announcements regards their decisions.

Active EBU members
On 29 June 2015, the national broadcaster of Cyprus, Cyprus Broadcasting Corporation (CyBC), revealed that they would not participate in the 2015 contest due to lack of funds.
France 2 announced on 24 June 2015 that they had no plans to return to the contest, however the broadcaster sent a delegation to Bulgaria in order to observe the 2015 edition.
Zweites Deutsches Fernsehen (ZDF) were observers at last year's contest. On 2 June 2015, Norddeutscher Rundfunk (NDR) stated that they had not ruled out a début in the 2015 contest. On 1 July 2015, ARD consortium member NDR launched an online poll to decide whether or not Germany should participate in Junior Eurovision, which would be broadcast on their children's station, KiKa (which is a joint venture of ARD and ZDF). Germany was originally on the list of participants for the inaugural contest and again in 2004 but later withdrew. The debut of the country in the competition didn't materialize. However, on 4 November 2015, it was announced that NDR would broadcast a livestream of the contest on their Eurovision website for the first time.
Hellenic Broadcasting Corporation (ERT) stated on 11 June 2015 that they were undecided about returning to the Junior contest but are "willing to examine interesting projects". However, the country was not among the 2015 edition's list of participants.
On 4 June 2015, Televisiunea Românâ (TVR) revealed that due to lack of interest, Romania's participation in the 2015 contest would be unlikely.
Several media outlets reported that Televisión Española (TVE) was working on returning to the contest in 2015. However, these claims were not confirmed by the broadcaster. Ultimately the country was not among the 2015 edition's list of participants.
Sveriges Television (SVT) announced on 29 June 2015 that the broadcaster would withdraw from the contest for one year to focus on new youth-focused projects and hosting the Eurovision Song Contest 2016.

Non-active EBU members
In August 2014, executive supervisor Vladislav Yakovlev said that they are working on finding a way to allow commercial networks to participate in the contest, although they are not EBU members.
Because Spanish broadcaster EBU member, Televisión Española (TVE), has declined invitations to participate since 2007, the European Broadcasting Union TV Committee will discuss in the coming months the possibility to allow commercial channels to take part in the contest. If the final decision is yes, they will continue negotiating with Spanish private TV channels to bring back Spain to the contest.

Broadcasts 

The contest was broadcast online worldwide through the official Junior Eurovision Song Contest website and YouTube. The online broadcasts featured commentary in English by junioreurovision.tv editor Luke Fisher and 2011 Bulgarian Junior Eurovision Song Contest entrant Ivan Ivanov.

The following non-participating countries also sent commentators to Bulgaria for radio, television and online broadcasts of the contest.

Other awards

Press vote
At the press center during the contest, members of the press were allowed to vote for their favourite acts. Below is the top five overall results, after all the votes had been cast.

Official album

Junior Eurovision Song Contest Bulgaria 2015 is a compilation album put together by the European Broadcasting Union, and was released by Universal Music Group on 13 November 2015. The album features all the songs from the 2015 contest. This is the first since the Junior Eurovision Song Contest 2005 not to include karaoke versions of all the songs.

See also
 ABU Radio Song Festival 2015
 ABU TV Song Festival 2015
 Bala Turkvision Song Contest 2015
 Eurovision Song Contest 2015
 Eurovision Young Dancers 2015
 Turkvision Song Contest 2015

Notes

References

External links

 
2015
2015 song contests
2015 in radio
2015 television specials
2015 in Bulgaria
November 2015 events in Europe
Music competitions in Bulgaria
Events in Sofia